List of Abuta species — in the flowering plant family Menispermaceae.

Species
Species include:

Note: this list includes synonyms.

References

Abuta
Abuta 01